Bowral railway station is located on the Main South line in New South Wales, Australia. It serves the town of Bowral opening on 1 March 1867.

Platforms & services
Bowral has two side platforms. It is serviced by NSW TrainLink Southern Highlands Line services travelling between Campbelltown and Moss Vale with morning services to Sydney Central & evening services to Goulburn.

It is also serviced by NSW Trainlink Xplorer long-distance services from Sydney to Canberra & Griffith. This station is a request stop for this service, so the trains stop only if passengers booked to board/alight here.

Transport links
Berrima Buslines operate five routes that serve Bowral station:
806: to Bargo
808: to Kangaloon
811: Willow Vale to Moss Vale
816: Mittagong to Moss Vale

Berrima Buslines operate one route from Bowral station for NSW Trainlink:
Loopline Bus: to Picton station

Bowral is also served by one NSW TrainLink coach service between Bundanoon and Wollongong in each direction.

References

External links

Bowral station details Transport for New South Wales

Easy Access railway stations in New South Wales
Railway stations in Australia opened in 1867
Regional railway stations in New South Wales
Main Southern railway line, New South Wales
Southern Highlands (New South Wales)